Canal 11 is the subscription television channel of the Portuguese Football Federation. Broadcasts football, beach soccer, futsal and women's football games. It also transmits stories and original content about the Portuguese in the football world, in addition to debates between commentators.

Coverage

FPF 

 National teams
 Men's and Women's
 A-team (replays and classic matches)
Futsal
Beach Soccer
Every football and futsal youth teams
Algarve Cup
Supertaça (classic matches only, plus eSports coverage)
Taça de Portugal (selected live matches that not aired by other main FTA and pay-TV broadcasters, for semi-finals and final will be delayed to protect the cup's main rights holders, as well as classic matches)
Liga 3
 Campeonato de Portugal
 Liga Revelação - U-23
 Campeonato Nacional Sub-19
 Campeonato Nacional Sub-17 (sporadic matches)
 Campeonato Nacional Sub-15 (sporadic matches)
 Liga BPI
 Taça de Portugal Feminina
 Taça da Liga Feminina
 Supertaça Feminina - women's football supercup
 Liga Placard - Futsal National Championship
 Taça de Portugal de Futsal
 Taça da Liga de Futsal
 Supertaça de Futsal
 II Divisão Futsal - 2nd division (sporadic matches)
 Campeonato Nacional Futsal Feminino
 Taça de Portugal de Futsal Feminino
 Taça da Liga de Futsal Feminino - women's futsal league cup
 Supertaça de Futsal Feminino
 Futsal youth competitions (sporadic matches)
 Campeonato de Futebol de Praia
 Varied youth tournaments (men's and women's football and futsal)

Non-FPF 

 Liga Portugal 2 (selected matches not aired by the main rights holders)
 District/Regional cups finals (sporadic matches)

outside Portugal 

  UEFA Champions League (early qualification round matches)
  UEFA Europa League (selected matches not aired by the main rights holders)
  UEFA Europa Conference League (selected matches not aired by the main rights holders)

 UEFA Youth League (shared with and sublicensed from Eleven Sports)
Under-20 Intercontinental Cup
 Africa Cup of Nations
  Série A
  Paulistão
 SheBelieves Cup
 AFC Champions League (formerly)
  Super League (formerly)
  Super League (formerly)
  Ekstraklasa (formerly)
 Ligat ha'Al (formerly)
  Liga MX (formerly)
  K League (formerly)
 Premier League (formerly)

References

External links
 
FPF websiste 

Sports television in Portugal
Television stations in Portugal
Football in Portugal